Imma congrualis is a moth in the family Immidae. It was described by Walsingham in 1900. It is found in New Guinea.

The wingspan is 25–28 mm. The forewings are fuscous, faintly purplish-tinged and with an indistinct dark fuscous discal dot at three-fifths, in females with a narrow terminal fascia of dark fuscous suffusion, in males linear and nearly obsolete. The hindwings in males have a shallow submedian groove, furnished with some rather dark fuscous long hairs, in females becoming more blackish-fuscous posteriorly.

References

Moths described in 1900
Immidae
Moths of New Guinea